Mapa Rallalage Chandima Niroshan Bandaratilleke (born 16 May 1975) is a former Sri Lankan cricketer, who played seven Test matches and three One Day Internationals for the Sri Lanka national cricket team. He played as a right-handed batsman and a left-arm slow bowler.

Domestic career
Bandaratilleke played first-class cricket from 1994 to 2009 for Badureliya Sports Club.

International career
When he played for Sri Lanka his bowling style was praised as a complement to Muttiah Muralitharan. He generally took good advantage of poor wickets, none more so than when he took his career best bowling figures of 9/83 against New Zealand in his second Test of the career.

1975 births
Living people
Sri Lanka One Day International cricketers
Sri Lanka Test cricketers
Sri Lankan cricketers
Basnahira North cricketers
Tamil Union Cricket and Athletic Club cricketers
Uva cricketers